Orley Farm School is one of the largest coeducational preparatory day school in the London borough of Harrow, at the foot of Harrow Hill on South Hill Avenue. It was founded as the preparatory school for the nearby Harrow School in 1850 but is now a fully private school in its own right and leavers continue to other private schools.

History
Orley Farm has evolved since September 1850 from a boarding school for boys preparing for Harrow, to a co-educational, day school.

In 1984 the Official Grant of Arms was awarded.  The arms and crest have three historical sources: (1) the stag holding an oak leaf is the Trollope family crest; (due to the renaming of the school in 1862 to that of the book of the same name written by Anthony Trollope describing the buildings owned by the family and occupied by the school) (2) crossed arrows and a silver laurel wreath are included on the Harrow arms, and (3) the “Hurst” of oak trees on the shield and sprig of oak in the badge refer to the Gardner family.  The motto, Haec cogitate., “think on these things”, comes from St Paul’s letter to the Philippians.

Orley Farm was originally a traditional boarding prep school similar to the likes of Ludgrove and Heatherdown Preparatory Schools. During the 1980s by about 1983, boarding was phased out after over 130 years and the dormitories were converted into classrooms. In 1994, the school administration made the landmark decision of admitting girls for the first time. The pre-prep department had opened by 1992 when boys aged rising 5 were admitted.

Edge
Orley farm has a program called the Edge Programme and consists of extracurricular activities such as cooking, photography, house skills and looking after the wildlife. This programme runs from Y5 to Y8.

Houses
Each pupil  and staff is randomly assigned to one of the four houses upon entry. The houses are named after former headmasters and activities are overseen by house teachers.

New Buildings

Butler Hall
In July 2015, the first of 4 major building projects came on line after the school invested just under £10 million to upgrade the facilities. The new dining hall overlooking the pool was named after Lord Butler, a former pupil, who visited the school to open the building.

Elliot Block
In September 2015, the original music school was turned into a building called the Elliot Block. It consists of new facilities supporting Drama and Music and was named after Ian Elliott, a former Headmaster.

Davies Library
In September 2015, the Davies Library was reopened having moved it from the old Gardner building and tripling the size.  It was opened by Justin Davies, a former Headmaster.

Gardener Building
In February 2016, the new Gardener Building opened with 12 refurbished classrooms joined to the Elliott Building via an enclosed bridge. The Mathematics, English, computer science & Science departments are now all housed in this facility.

Former Pupils
Robin Butler, retired senior civil servant
Alastair Fothergill, producer
Keir Giles, academic
Matthew Gould, former Ambassador to Israel, now Head of Cyber Security
Anthony Horowitz, author and screenwriter
Sir Arnold Lunn, inventor of slalom skiing and Catholic apologist
Martin Stevens, former MP and Conservative politician
Dale Winton, radio DJ and presenter

References

External links
School Website
Profile on the ISC website

1850 establishments in England
Educational institutions established in 1850
Private co-educational schools in London
Private schools in the London Borough of Harrow
Preparatory schools in London